Amathusiini is a tribe of the nymphalid butterfly subfamily Morphinae. They are large butterflies. They are sometimes treated as a distinct subfamily Amathusiinae or family Amathusiidae.

Genera and selected species
 Aemona
 Aemona amathusia – yellow dryad
 Aemona lena – white dryad
 Amathusia
 Amathusia andamanensis – Andaman palmking
 Amathusia phidippus – palmking
 Amathuxidia
 Amathuxidia amythaon – koh-i-noor
 Discophora
 Discophora deo – banded duffer 
 Discophora lepida – southern duffer 
 Discophora sondaica – common duffer
 Discophora timora – great duffer
 Enispe
 Enispe euthymius – red caliph
 Enispe cycnus – blue caliph
 Enispe intermedia
 Faunis
 Melanocyma
 Morphopsis
 Stichophthalma
 Stichophthalma camadeva – northern jungle queen
 Stichophthalma nourmahal – chocolate jungle queen
 Stichophthalma sparta – Manipur jungle queen
 Taenaris
 Thaumantis
 Thaumantis diores – jungle glory
 Thauria
 Thauria aliris – tufted jungleking
 Thauria lathyi – jungleking
 Xanthotaenia
Zeuxidia

External links

Pteron. In Japanese but the excellent images are accompanied by correct binomial names.

 
Butterfly tribes